Highland Fling is a 1936 British comedy film directed by Manning Haynes and starring Charlie Naughton, Jimmy Gold and Frederick Bradshaw. It was made as a quota quickie by the British subsidiary of 20th Century Fox at Wembley Studios. Two incompetent detectives search for a missing document at the Highland Games.

Cast
 Charlie Naughton as Smith
 Jimmy Gold as Smythe 
 Frederick Bradshaw as Tony  
 Evelyn Foster as Jean 
 Gibson Gowland as Delphos  
 Naomi Plaskitt as Katherine  
 Peter Popp as Clockmender 
 Bill Shine (actor) as Lizards

References

Bibliography
 Chibnall, Steve. Quota Quickies: The Birth of the British 'B' Film. British Film Institute, 2007.
 Low, Rachael. Filmmaking in 1930s Britain. George Allen & Unwin, 1985.
 Wood, Linda. British Films, 1927-1939. British Film Institute, 1986.

External links

1936 films
British comedy films
1936 comedy films
Films directed by H. Manning Haynes
Films shot at Wembley Studios
Films set in Scotland
20th Century Fox films
British black-and-white films
1930s English-language films
1930s British films